Transition is the seventh album by the group Kenny Rogers & The First Edition.

Track listing 
"Take My Hand" (Kenny Rogers)
"What Am I Gonna Do" (Carole King, Toni Stern)
"All God's Lonely Children" (Alex Harvey)
"Lay It Down" (Gene Thomas)
"Tulsa Turnaround" (Alex Harvey, Larry Collins)
"Poem For My Lady" (Mac Davis)
"For The Good Times" (Kris Kristofferson)
"Good Lady of Toronto" (Peter Gallway)
"Two Little Boys" (Alan Braden, Edward Madden, Theodore Morse)
"Where Does Rosie Go" (Kim Carnes)

Personnel 
Kenny Rogers - bass, vocals
Kin Vassy - guitar, vocals
Terry Williams - guitar, vocals
Mickey Jones - drums
Mary Arnold - background vocals

1971 albums
Kenny Rogers and The First Edition albums
Albums produced by Jimmy Bowen
Reprise Records albums